BricsCAD is a software application for computer-aided design (CAD), developed by Bricsys nv. The company was founded in 2002 by Erik de Keyser, a longtime CAD entrepreneur. In 2011 Bricsys acquired the intellectual property rights from Ledas for constraints-based parametric design tools, permitting the development of applications in the areas of direct modeling and assembly design. Bricsys is headquartered in Ghent, Belgium, and has additional development centers in Nizhny Novgorod and Novosibirsk, Russia; Bucharest, Romania and Singapore. Bricsys is a founding member of the Open Design Alliance, and joined the BuildingSMART International consortium in December 2016.

In 2018, Bricsys nv was acquired in full by Hexagon AB of Sweden.

The BricsCAD Editions 
Today, BricsCAD is available for the Windows, Linux and macOS operating systems, and comes in five, workflow-centric Editions. Prior to the release of V21, a sixth edition called BricsCAD Platinum was available. With the release of V21, all BricsCAD Platinum functionality was moved to BricsCAD Pro, and the Platinum Edition was deprecated.
 BricsCAD Lite (BricsCAD Classic' in V20 and below) is designed and optimized for 2D drafting workflows. It reads and writes native DWG, and offers a LISP API for customization and the automation of repetitive tasks.
 BricsCAD Pro contains all the functionality of BricsCAD Lite, plus 3D modeling and parametrics, standard part libraries, a rendering engine, a materials library, and an Autodesk AutoCAD ObjectARX-compatible development system that supports hundreds of third-party application programs. In V21 and above, BricsCAD Pro offers the features of the deprecated Platinum Edition, including 3D constraint system management, surface entity creation and lofting, TIN surface creation, deformable modeling, automatic healing of imported solid geometry, automatic design intent recognition, and basic assembly creation & editing.
 BricsCAD BIM contains the functionality of BricsCAD Pro, and adds a concept-through-documentation Building Information Modeling workflow. BricsCAD BIM uses ACIS as its core modeler, allowing push-pull, free-form development of concept models. Low level-of-development (LOD) massing models can be automatically converted to a Building Information Model using an A.I.-assisted workflow, called BIMIFY. BricsCAD BIM also supports the concept of "continuous Level of Development" via a machine learning / A.I.-assisted feature named PROPAGATE. This feature supports the concept of "model once, use many times" with regard to BIM data refinement. In BricsCAD BIM V21, sheet set generation has also been automated, with the first delivery of a drawing sheet standards manager. The core database schema of BricsCAD BIM is based on the Industry Foundation Classes (IFC) from BuildingSMART International. BricsCAD BIM is certified by BuildingSMART International as compliant with the IFC openBIM 'IFC4' import and export schemas.
 BricsCAD Mechanical contains all the functionality of BricsCAD Pro, and is optimized for 3D mechanical part and component design. It contains an assembly modeling workflow, the creation of sheet metal parts using unique lofted solid representations, kinematic animations, bills-of-materials and exploded-view creation tools. Like BricsCAD Pro, BricsCAD Mechanical is based on a push-pull, direct modeling engine. It is a history-free modeler, and is claimed to be free of the 'regeneration failures' of history-based modellers

.
BricsCAD Ultimate is a bundle that combines all the BricsCAD editions - Classic, Pro, BIM and Mechanical - into a single installer package.
The BricsCAD 30 day free trial download is a full commercial version of the BricsCAD Ultimate Edition. During the trial, customers can use the RUNASLEVEL command to try any of the BricsCAD Editions. At the end of the trial period, BricsCAD reverts to a free-of-cost 3D solid modeler, called BricsCAD Shape. At any time, a trial version (or an installation of BricsCAD Shape) can be converted to a full commercial license with the entry of a valid license key. The license key determines the user's Edition.

BricsCAD BIM, BricsCAD Mechanical and BricsCAD Ultimate were added to the BricsCAD product family in late 2018. Prior to V19, the BricsCAD BIM product was delivered as a module called "BIM for BricsCAD''", and required a separate license of BricsCAD Platinum. BricsCAD Mechanical was added with the release of BricsCAD V19. It was based on the 3D direct modeling functionality sourced from the pre-V19 "Sheet Metal for BricsCAD" module, and additional MCAD toolsets, developed in-house.

All BricsCAD editions use the Open Design Alliance Drawing API software development platform, giving BricsCAD read and write capability of the DWG file format, made popular by Autodesk's AutoCAD. BricsCAD reads and writes DWG files directly via its NEW, OPEN, SAVE and SAVEAS commands. The software is capable of most contemporary AutoCAD release functions. BricsCAD is currently localized into 15 language versions.

 Communicator for BricsCAD Communicator for BricsCAD is an add-on that imports and exports 3D CAD data (geometry & Product Manufacturing Information [PMI]) for data exchange with major Mechanical CAD programs (e.g. CATIA, PTC Creo, Solid Edge, NX/UG, SolidWorks and Autodesk Inventor) and several industry-standard neutral file formats. The BricsCAD Communicator works with BricsCAD Pro for single part import/export, and BricsCAD Mechanical for assembly import/export.

 BricsCAD Shape 
In January 2018 Bricsys released a free-of-charge conceptual modelling tool called BricsCAD Shape. It was derived from the BricsCAD solid modelling core.

The geometry domain of BricsCAD Shape is equivalent to that of BricsCAD and the native file format of both products is DWG. BricsCAD Shape has a simplified user interface that reduces command options to a minimum for support of effective solids modelling. BricsCAD Shape also includes a library of parametric windows and doors, materials libraries and a set of 3D furniture and objects.

 Bricsys 24/7 
Bricsys also provides a cloud collaboration SaaS (software as a service) Common Data Environment (CDE) called Bricsys 24/7. Prior to 9 November 2017, Bricsys 24/7 was known as Chapoo.

It comes in two versions:

 Bricsys 24/7 is the Common Data Environment (CDE) for document management and workflow automation including role-based security.
 BricsCAD Cloud''' is an in-product panel that gives BricsCAD users access to cloud storage, file viewing, collaboration and simple file locking / versioning, on the Bricsys 24/7 cloud. A basic access and storage allocation is a part of the BricsCAD Maintenance offering. Additional BricsCAD Cloud storage is available for a fee.

APIs and customization 
BricsCAD implements many of the AutoCAD Application Programming Interfaces (APIs). In general, BricsCAD provides a nearly identical subset of AutoCAD-equivalent function names. In the case of non-compiled AutoCAD applications (e.g. LISP, Diesel and DCL), these programs can be loaded and executed directly in BricsCAD. Specifically regarding LISP routines, BricsCAD supports AutoCAD Vl, Vlr, Vla and Vlax functions. Bricsys also supports developers who wish to use LISP encryption, BricsCAD cannot read AutoCAD FAS (compiled LISP) files.

Most compiled application programs developed for AutoCAD's Advanced Runtime eXtension (ObjectARX) facility require recompilation with the BricsCAD Runtime eXtension (BRX) libraries. BRX is source code-compatible with AutoCAD's ARX 2018, with a few exceptions. Bricsys also supports the deprecated Autodesk Development System (ADS) through BricsCAD's (also deprecated) SDS interface.

Partners 
Bricsys works with application development partners to bring AEC (Architecture, Engineering and Construction), Civil, GIS and Mechanical CAD tools.

Bricsys offers LGS 2D and 3D, two component technologies that enable 2D and 3D constraint management.  Bricsys offers licensing of these modules to software developers that build products on Windows (32/64-bit), MacOS, and Linux, for integration into their own software products. Licensees for these modules include ASCON (CAD), Cimatron (CAD/CAM) and others.

Comparison of speed 
According to BricsCAD advocates, BricsCAD's OpenLisp-based run-time environment is faster than AutoLISP (in Autodesk, Inc's AutoCAD).

See also 
 Computer-aided design
 List of CAx companies
 Comparison of CAD software
 Comparison of CAD editors for CAE

References

External links 
 

3D graphics software
Computer-aided design software
Computer-aided manufacturing software
Building information modeling
MacOS computer-aided design software
Computer-aided design software for Linux
Proprietary commercial software for Linux
Software that uses wxWidgets